State Route 340 (SR 340) is a state highway in the eastern portion of the U.S. state of Tennessee. It travels south-to-north through portions of Cocke, Greene and Hamblen counties.

Route description

Cocke County

SR 340 begins in the mountains of Cocke County at an intersection with US 25/US 70/SR 9 just west of Del Rio along the banks of the French Broad River. It winds its way northward through the mountains before entering farmland and passing through Parrottsville, where it has an intersection with US 321/SR 35. It then passes through some ridges and rolling countryside before crossing into Greene County.

Greene County

SR 340 then crosses a bridge over the Nolichucky River before turning northeast to run parallel to the river and have an intersection SR 349. It continues northeast through farmland to pass through Warrensburg before having an intersection with SR 348. Shortly afterwards, SR 340 crosses into Hamblen County.

Hamblen County

SR 340 then leaves the riverbanks and has an interchange with I-81 (Exit 15). The highway continues northeast through farmland before coming to an end at an intersection with SR 113.

Road concurrencies and mileage

Major intersections

See also

References

External links
 

340
Transportation in Cocke County, Tennessee
Transportation in Greene County, Tennessee
Transportation in Hamblen County, Tennessee